Lima is a town of the Department of San Pedro Paraguay.

District of Lima 

One of the districts of the Second Department of San Pedro Paraguay, which is more than 330 km from the city Asuncion.

It was founded in 1792 and it is credited to Fray Pedro Bartolome, as a mission with Guanás Indians, on the shores of  Aguaray River.

Lima was founded in 1901, as the 2nd district. Department of San Pedro.

With an area of approximately 992 km2, and an estimated population of 10,367 Inhab

Located on the River Aguaray Guazú, whose main activities are livestock, the exploitation of mate and some agricultural crops.

With its population of about 10,367 inhabitants it has a density of 13 inhabitants / km2.

It also has airfields for small and medium-sized machines.

Geography 

This district is accessible by Route 3 General Elizardo Aquino, and Route No. 11 Juana de Lara.

Other routes are without pavement.

The internal roads do not have any kind of paving.

Today, this district has public transport services with  interdistrict services and daily services up to the country's capital, and also to Ciudad del Este Pedro Juan Caballero Brazil, Argentina and Chile.

The District has an airport (runway).

It is bordered on the north by the District of Nueva Germania and the District of Santa Rosa del Aguaray, both districts separated by the Aguaray Guazú River.

To the south are the District of San Pablo and the District of Choré. The Jejui Guazú River; separates the two districts.

To the east lies the District General Isidro Resquín.
At the west lies the District of San Pedro de Ycuamandiyú, and the District of Nueva Germania, the Aguaray Guazú River separates both districts.

Hydrography 

Rio Aguaray Guazú, its beaches are creamy, its white sand draws people in times of very hot weather.

The Jejui Guazú River is the least polluted river in the country.

Climate 

It is wet and rainy, the relative humidity is 70 to 80%. The average temperature is 23 °C, the highest in summer is 35 °C and the least is 10 °C.

Language 

The predominant language is Guaraní, that is approximately spoken by the 80% of the population. Spanish and Guaraní (Jopara) is spoken by 20% of the remaining population.

Demographics 

The District of Lima, according to the National Housing Census for 2002 has a total population of 10,367 inhabitants. In the urban area the amount is of 2,131 inhabitants, and in the rural area is 8,236 inhabitants.

Its rural population is 79.44% of the total population.

The total households in the district amounts to the amount of 2,064, of which corresponds to households in urban areas the number of 506, and in rural areas the number of 1,558 households, representing 75.48% of the households living in rural areas.

According to the projection of the district's total population, by gender and year have the following details:

 By the year 2008 the total population will be of 11,125 inhabitants, of whom 5,860 men and 5,265 women.
 By 2009, the total population will be of 11,192 inhabitants, of whom 5,898 men and 5,294 women.
 By 2010, the total population will be of 11,260 inhabitants, of whom 5,936 men and 5,324 women.
 By the year 2011, the total population will be of 11,304 inhabitants, of whom 5,962 men and 5,342 women.
 By the year 2012, the total population will be of 11,349 inhabitants, of whom 5,989 men and 5,361 women.
 By the year 2013, the total population will be of 11,394 inhabitants, of whom 6,015 men and 5,379 women.

As for the main socio-demographic indicators, the district of Lima has the following details:

 Population Less than 15 years 43.5%.
 Average of 3.6 children per woman.
 Illiterate: 8.4%.
 Employed by the primary sector: 67.6%.
 Employed by the secondary sector: 6.3% ..
 Employed in the tertiary sector: 25.1%.
 Occupied work in the agricultural field: 67.3%.
 Homes with electricity: 78.4%.
 Homes with running water: 41.0%.

History 

It is one of the typical populations born at the end of eighteenth century to retain a strong Franciscan mark, while Choré and Guayaybi are notable for their intense agricultural production. Until today it retains its old adobe church, built in colonial times.

At present, "INDERT", formerly the Rural Welfare Institute, has enabled the following:

Communal Fields 

In 1984, by Resolution No. 1753, with an area of 146 ha. The Colony Sargento Montanía.

In 1998, by Resolution No. 1165, with an area of 179 ha. The Colony San Jose del Norte.

There are also colonies: Loma Clavel, with an area of 180 ha. Mayor Hermosa-COSTA PUCU with an area of 1167 hectares. And the Mayor of Hermosa-Sgto. Montania.

Ecological Reserves 

In the District of Lima, is the Ecological Reserve CAPIITINDY with an area of 102 hectares, which was created in 1995, by Resolution No. 1251.

Indigenous Colonies 

It is the community AVARIYU with an area of 237 ha, in the years 1980 and 1991, by Resolution No. 789.799, and 1623 respectively.

Economy 

The city is a major center of activity that includes livestock production of cattle, horses, sheep and pigs.

In agriculture, there are crops in the district like mate, cotton, tobacco, sugar cane, cassava, sesame, cedrón Paraguay, soy, beans, potatoes, alfalfa, citrus, peanuts, wheat and cassava. Oranges; sour and sweet, and sunflower.

The main activity of its residents is the development of mate.

68.7% of the department's population is poor and the while the rest of the population is not considered poor, the needs are very marked, their average monthly income per family is of 496,645 Guaraní, representing a per person average monthly income of 95,915 Guaraní.

Livestock: cattle, horses, pigs.

Tourism 

The beaches that are watered by the River Aguaray Guazú are of white and crystal sand, which attracts domestic tourism. It also has health resorts, farms and a square that are the attractions of the city.

The health resort Raul Valiente, has beautiful beaches on the River Aguaray and has Quinchos, sports fields, changing rooms, canteens, etc. It is a private place, managed by an association of taxi drivers.

As an attraction it retains its old adobe church, built in times of Spanish Colony, in honor of San Francisco and Virgen del Rosario,  although a more modern temple has been built.

References 

 Geografía del Paraguay – Editorial Hispana Paraguay S.R.L.- 1a. Edición 1999 – Asunción Paraguay
 Geografía Ilustrada del Paraguay – Distribuidora Arami S.R.L.
 La Magia de nuestra tierra. Fundación en Alianza. Asunción. 2007.

External links 
 Secretaria Nacional de Turismo

Populated places in the San Pedro Department, Paraguay